Sukhovsky is a rural locality (a khutor) in Rechenskoye Rural Settlement, Alexeyevsky District, Volgograd Oblast, Russia. The population was 48 as of 2010.

Geography 
Sukhovsky is located 36 km southwest of Alexeyevskaya (the district's administrative centre) by road. Rechensky is the nearest rural locality.

References 

Rural localities in Alexeyevsky District, Volgograd Oblast